The Halltown Union Colored Sunday School, also known as the Halltown Memorial Chapel, in Halltown, West Virginia, was built in 1901 in the Gothic Revival style.  The stone chapel was built by and for the local African-American community on a small parcel of land donated by Daniel B. Lucas from his Rion Hall estate, next to the Halltown Colored Free School.  The non-denominational Sunday School operated until 1967, although the building continued in use for weddings and funerals. In 1982 a committee was formed to restore the building, which was carried out the next year.

It was listed on the National Register of Historic Places in 1984.

References

External links

Properties of religious function on the National Register of Historic Places in West Virginia
Buildings and structures in Jefferson County, West Virginia
Stone churches in West Virginia
1901 establishments in West Virginia
Gothic Revival architecture in West Virginia
African-American history of West Virginia
National Register of Historic Places in Jefferson County, West Virginia
Religious buildings and structures completed in 1901